Francis Fulford (born 31 August 1952) is a member of the United Kingdom's landed gentry, the 23rd Fulford to have owned and inhabited Great Fulford manor house in Devon. After briefly working as a stockbroker, he has had a career as a television personality and presenter.

Family estate
Fulford is lord of the manor of Great Fulford, the current owner of the estate which was granted to his ancestor William de Fulford by King Richard about 1191, as a reward for military service on the Third Crusade. The present great house dates back to the 16th century.

Life and career
Francis Fulford is the son of Lieutenant-Colonel Francis Edgar Anthony Fulford and Joan Shirley, younger daughter of Rear-Admiral C. Maurice Blackman, DSO. He is a great-great-grandson of Francis Fulford (1803–1868), Bishop of Montreal.

Fulford attended Sunningdale School in Berkshire, but failed the common entrance exam for Eton, so instead attended Milton Abbey School in Dorset. After leaving there, he did not go on to any higher education. At 18 he started a career with the Coldstream Guards, but failed the Army Officer Selection Board exam and so left after nine months. He travelled to Australia to work as a jackaroo, but soon returned to Britain, re-taking (and again failing) the Army Officer Selection Board exam, before moving to London to work as a stockbroker and insurance broker. Since inheriting the family estate he has devoted himself to its management, though it is in need of restoration and currently (according to his many television appearances) in a state of severe debt. He lives there with his wife Kishanda and four children.

Since 2004 he has maintained an ongoing career in reality television, appearing in various entertainment and documentary-style programmes, many of which (such as The F***ing Fulfords) make a feature of his casual swearing, prejudices, and traditionalist views.

In 2007 he attempted a move into local politics, standing for a seat on Teignbridge District Council as a member of the Conservative Party. He was defeated, gaining 370 votes out of an electorate of 2215. In all previous local elections, the Conservative Party candidate(s) had been elected easily. The Teign Valley is currently (2020) represented by two Conservative Party councillors on the Teignbridge District Council.

As of 2014 Fulford was a member of the UK Independence Party.

Reality television
The F***ing Fulfords (2004)
How Clean Is Your House? (2004)
Why America Sucks (2005) 
Why England's F***ed (2005)
Country House Rescue (2012)
Salvage Hunters (2012)
Life Is Toff (6 episodes) (2014)
Help! My House Is Haunted (2018)

Publications
Bearing Up: The Long View, Timewell Press, London 2004,

Ancestry

References

External links
  Great Fulford
 Francis Fulford's Blog

1952 births
Living people
English agriculturalists
Television personalities from Devon
UK Independence Party people
People educated at Milton Abbey School
People from Teignbridge (district)
Fulford family
People educated at Sunningdale School